Ataídes Oliveira (born December 18, 1959) is a Brazilian politician. He has represented Tocantins in the Federal Senate since 2013. He is a member of the Brazilian Social Democracy Party.

References

Living people
1959 births
Members of the Federal Senate (Brazil)
Brazilian Social Democracy Party politicians
People from Goiás
Brazilian businesspeople